Callogaza sericata is a species of sea snail, a marine gastropod mollusk in the family Margaritidae.

Description
The size of the shell varies between 10 mm and 20 mm.

Distribution
This marine occurs in the Northwest Pacific off the Philippines to Japan at depths between 50 m and 300 m.

References

 Higo, S., Callomon, P. & Goto, Y. (1999). Catalogue and bibliography of the marine shell-bearing Mollusca of Japan. Osaka. : Elle Scientific Publications. 749 pp.
  Luiz Ricardo L. Simone & Carlo M. Cunha, Revision of genera Gaza and Callogaza (Vetigastropoda, Trochidae), with description of a new Brazilian species; Zootaxa1318: 1–40 (2006)

External links
 To World Register of Marine Species
 

sericata
Gastropods described in 1959